Aspásia is a municipality in the state of São Paulo in Brazil. The population is 1,818 (2020 est.) in an area of 69.3 km². The elevation is 595 m.

References

Municipalities in São Paulo (state)